Pucallpa (Shipibo: May Ushin) is a city in eastern Peru located on the banks of the Ucayali River, a major tributary of the Amazon River. It is the capital of the Ucayali region, the Coronel Portillo Province and the Calleria District.

This city is categorized as the only metropolis in Ucayali, being the largest populated center of the region. According to the Instituto Nacional de Estadística e Informática, it is the tenth most populated city in Peru and second largest in the Peruvian Amazon after Iquitos. In 2013 it housed a population of 211,611 inhabitants.

Although originally located in the district of Callería, in the 1980s it formed a conurbation with the towns of Puerto Callao (district of Yarinacocha) and San Fernando (district of Manantay, created in 2000).

Most of the transport to Pucallpa is done through the Ucayali River, located in the central east of Peru and which contains the second most important river port in the Amazon (behind Iquitos). The Federico Basadrees highway is the main center of land transportation and connects the northwest of the city with the Captain Rolden International Airport (Aeropuerto Internacional Capitán FAP David Abensur Rengifo), where flights are made to Brazil.

The economy of Pucallpa is based on trade, the timber industry and tourism. Among the main attractions of the city include ecological tourism, such as the Parque Natural, or cultural tourism, in the case of shamanism. Its main economic activities are fishing, agriculture, livestock and timber extraction. In addition, a small oil refinery near the Pachitea River and a gas refinery in the Curimaná District supply fuel to the city and the center of the country.

The first human inhabitants of the region were the Pano, who inhabited the entire length of the Ucayali River and its tributaries three millennia before being colonized.

History and transportation
Pucallpa was founded in the 1840s by Franciscan missionaries who settled several families of the Shipibo-Conibo ethnic group. For several decades it remained a small settlement as it was isolated from the rest of the country by the Amazon rainforest and the Andes mountain range. From the 1880s through the 1920s a railway project to connect Pucallpa with the rest of the country via the Ferrocarril Central Andino was started and dropped several times until it was finally abandoned. Pucallpa's isolation finally ended in 1945 with the completion of a highway to Lima through Tingo Maria. The highway allowed the commercialization of regional products to the rest of the country, thus improving the economic outlook of the region and its capital, Pucallpa. However, the heavy rainfalls of the Amazon rainforest remain a problem as they erode the highway and can even undermine it by causing flash floods.  Pucallpa is served by air through the Captain Rolden International Airport and by river through its port Pucallpillo near the center of the city. During the high water season, the floating ports of La Hoyada and Puerto Italia are used for riverine communications. Pucallpa is connected by road to Lima via Huánuco and Cerro de Pasco. The San Lorenzo Megaport Project proposes to connect Lima with the Atlantic via a rail connection to Pucallpa and the Amazon.

Geography

Climate 
Pucallpa has a tropical monsoon climate (Köppen: Am).

Public Services

Supply Chain 
The city is home to 9 municipal markets. 5 of these are located in the district of Callería, and 1 is located in the district of Yarinacocha. The 9 municipal markets are as follows:

Municipal markets 

 Municipal Market 1: Market located on the banks of the Ucayali River.
 Municipal Market 2: Market located in the center of the city, two blocks south of the municipality.
 Municipal Market 3: Market located between the Guillermo Sisley and Victor Montalvo streets.
 Municipal Market 4: (or Micaela Bastidas) Market belonging to the district of Manantay, located at kilometer 2 of the centennial avenue. In 2009, this site also housed a municipal fair with 800 commercial stores.
 Yarinacocha Municipal Market: Market of the Yarinense district, located a few blocks east of the district's main square.
 Manantay Municipal Market: Market of the Maintaino district, located in the Maya de Brito street, a few blocks west of the district's main square.
 Wholesale market: Market has been under construction since 2010.
 Retail market: Market has been under construction since 2010.

Informal mass markets 

 Bellavista Market: Non-municipal market of the Callerino district, located on the Bellavista avenue.
 La Hoyada Market: Non-municipal riverside market, located on Sáenz Peña Avenue.

To prevent the informal trade that is rampant in the city, transfers between respective markets were established, increasing the economy of this type of sale. In 2014, Peruvian Supermarkets, owner of the commercial land, formally opened a hypermarket on kilometer 4 of Centenario Avenue that expands toward Amazonas Avenue. The franchises in the market, including Real Plaza, Ripley, Plaza Vee and Promart, generated 200 jobs.

Drinking water and drainage 
The Municipal Drinking Water and Sewerage Company of Coronel Portillo (Español: La Empresa Municipal de Agua Potable y Alcantarillado de Coronel Portillo) is the main company in water management, beginning operation on July 1, 1992. The company aims to carry out all activities related to the provision of public drinking water and sewerage service in the area of the Province of Coronel Portillo through its headquarters in the east of Pucallpa. Much of its work in supplying water is aimed at connection and supply. Houses have a connection to the public water service in Coronel Portillo, and 28% more water has been used within the four provinces.

Energy 
Electricity is managed by the company Electro Ucayali, created on February 28, 1995. This company is located in the eastern part of the country, and its activities correspond to an isolated electrical system in the same region. The administrative seat of Electro Ucayali is in the district of Yarinacocha.

Since 2001, the government has installed transmission lines from the Aguaytía river. The actions and work of this company had led to several inconveniences for its workers, such as 24 hour blackouts. There has been a negative reception to this company's service, with some calling it “Electropeor”. One reason for this is due to service outages that have negatively affected the city for the past 20 years.

Education 
Since its foundation, education has always been encouraged in Pucallpa. The first instances of formal education are not known, but according to a 1950 census, it was started with Franciscan missionaries around the town's founding.

Since then, education has expanded considerably in this area. According to education quality statistics from the Peru Ministry of Education, between three districts in 2010 there were 700 public schools, varying in quality, and 60 private schools. The school with the highest number of students was La Inmaculada with 2,879 students in 1998; however, the number has dropped to 2,229 students since then.

 No level of education: 18,568 (13,349 are between 3 and 5 years old)
 Full initial: 6,922 (38,26 are between 5 and 9 years old)
 Complete primary: 80,049 (24,367 are between 5 and 14 years old)
 Complete secondary: 106,672 (21,708 are between 10 and 19 years old)

At the university level, the most well known are: The public University of Ucayali (UNU) and the National Intercultural University of the Amazon (UNIA), and the University of Peru (UAP).  Of these, out of the 539 students who applied to the University of Ucayali, only 25% enrolled in the university, leading to a much smaller than expected incoming class.

 Incomplete pre-university study: 13,904
 Full pre-university study: 14,048
 Incomplete university study: 9,721
 Full university study: 12,074

In June 2010, the government formed an agreement with the Presidency of Brazil. The objective was to encourage education between the countries, improving the cultural exchange for both groups.

Hygiene 
The cause of many hygiene problems in the city is the contamination of Lake Yarinacocha. This lake is the final destination of the municipality's drainage. This contamination has led to pollution and the extinction of species in the lake and surrounding areas. Although the city is not accustomed to this level of pollution, the goal of increasing and expanding pollution care services has been in place since 1960. One of the suggested solutions is the implementation of “ecological bathrooms”.

Considering the city's climate, improper use of pollution care could lead to deadly diseases.For example, in the past, the constant humidity in the rainy cycle has led to the detection of dengue hemorrhagic fever in the Manantay district.

Health 
Among the companies that focus on human health, the two most popular are SIS and ESSALUD. SIS has 55,963 members and ESSALUD has 45,109 members. In addition to having 12,087 members of private services, the remaining population (169,692) does not want to be insured, especially children under 14 years of age (40,653 of the rest).

The most notable hospitals in the Ucayali region are the Regional Hospital, the Regional Hospital in Callería; and the Amazonian Hospital in Yarinacocha. Since the 1950s, they continue to offer service to the whole locality.

Security 
In Pucallpa there were several waves of assaults and  less severe crimes such as: the aggression against journalists, murders, violence in regional strikes, among others. The most dangerous crimes are drug trafficking on the Federico Basadre highway, and water based river assaults, as these increase transportation vulnerability. There is little effort on improving citizen security, so citizens face these problems themselves, due to the little police presence and collaboration in the area. Despite this, some alternatives have emerged. An example of this comes from a proposal from the national police. This proposal suggests the increased presence of security cameras as well as mobile phones could be an effective deterrent to crime. In addition, the creation of a committee to coordinate security with the Peruvian State has been suggested.

See also
Tapiche Ohara's Reserve
 TANS Peru Flight 204 crash, 23 August 2005.
 LANSA Flight 508 crash, 24 December 1971.
 Yarinaqucha

References

External links

Populated places in the Ucayali Region
Cities in Peru
Regional capital cities in Peru